Dicerca tenebrica, the flatheaded wood borer or flatheaded poplar borer, is a brassy to black coloured beetle from Chrysochroinae subfamily which can be found in Canada and both Southern and Northeastern United States. The species was first described by William Kirby in 1837.

Description
D. tenebrica have a flat head (hence the name), while its vertex is slightly impressed from the middle. Both disk and vertex are coarsed and punctated. Its prothorax have lateral margins which are parallel at base and expanded closer to the middle. The lateral margins which are closer to elytron are subparallel and are wide farther from the middle.

Females of the D. tenebrica are different from the rest of the genus due to reduced middle tooth or it complete absence off.

Ecology
The species flies from March to November during which months it feeds on poplar species (especially Populus balsamifera. In Alberta, it is known for feeding on Pinus contorta, aspens, jack pines, and white spruces in which they also lay their eggs.

References

Further reading
Solomon, J. D. (1995). Guide to Insect Borers in North American Broadleaf Trees and Shrubs. USDA Forest Service Agriculture Handbook AH-706. 735 pp.

Beetles described in 1837
Beetles of North America
Buprestidae
Taxa named by William Kirby (entomologist)